Masovian Voivodeship is a voivodeship of Poland established in 1999.

Masovian Voivodeship may also refer to:

 Masovian Voivodeship (1526–1795), a voivodeship of the Crown of the Kingdom of Poland from 1526 to 1795
 Masovian Voivodeship (1793), an unrealized proposition for the voivodeship of the Polish–Lithuanian Commonwealth, proposed in 1793
 Masovian Voivodeship (1816–1837), a voivodeship of the Congress Poland from 1816 to 1837